Sabás Magaña García (January 24, 1921 in Morelia, Michoacán, Mexico – November 7, 1990) was the bishop of the diocese of Matamoros, chosen by Pope Paul VI on December 30, 1968, and receiving consecration in Rome on January 6, 1969. He served as bishop from 1969 until his death in 1990, being the second bishop of Matamoros.

References

External links
 Profile of Sabas on catholic-hierarchy.org 

1921 births
1990 deaths
People from Morelia
20th-century Roman Catholic bishops in Mexico